The 1977 Fischer-Grand Prix was a men's tennis tournament played on indoor hard courts at the Wiener Stadthalle in Vienna, Austria that was part of the 1977 Colgate-Palmolive Grand Prix. It was the third edition of the tournament and was held from 24 October through 30 October 1977. First-seeded Brian Gottfried won the singles title.

Finals

Singles

 Brian Gottfried defeated  Wojciech Fibak 6–1, 6–1
 It was Gottfried's 5th singles title of the year and the 12th of his career.

Doubles

 Bob Hewitt /  Frew McMillan defeated  Wojciech Fibak /  Jan Kodeš 6–4, 6–3
 It was Hewitt's 13th title of the year and the 43rd of his career. It was McMillan's 12th title of the year and the 48th of his career.

References

External links
 ITF tournament edition details
 ATP tournament profile

 
Fischer-Grand Prix
Vienna Open